The Thai–Lao Border War or know in Thai as Battle of Ban Romklao (December 1987 – February 1988) was a short confrontation between Thai and Lao forces. It involved a dispute over the map made by French surveyors in 1907 to mark the borders between Siam and French Indochina in the southern Luang Prabang Range. Ownership of the village of Ban Romklao on the border of Phitsanulok Province and three small border villages on the edge of Uttaradit Province was left unclear. This is the same map underlying the Cambodian–Thai border dispute. The agreed criterion for determining ownership was the natural watershed, but the French map makers at times ignored this.As the agreed-upon river Hoeng separated into two tributaries, both parties claimed different ones as the border, which, alongside logging disputes, gave rise to this conflict.

Battle 
A series of minor shooting incidents had occurred between Thai and Lao forces in 1984. In December 1987, however, Thai armed forces occupied the disputed village of Ban Romklao, raising the Thai flag over it. The government of the Lao People's Democratic Republic protested strongly, insisting the village was part of Botene District of Saiyabuli Province. Thailand replied that the village belonged to Chat Trakan District (amphoe) of  Phitsanulok Province. Lao Army forces staged a night attack on the small Thai garrison, driving the Thai soldiers from the village and replacing the Thai flag with that of Laos. Serious fighting followed, continuing for weeks until a cease-fire was declared on 19 February 1988.

On December 15, 1987, Thai F-5 planes bombed Lao positions in the region and Lao officials claimed Thailand shelled up to 10km into Sayaboury province. Frequent aerial attacks continued against the dug-in Lao alongside artillery exchanges, and by mid-January 1988 the Thai claimed to have secured 70% of ground around Hill 1428. The fighting continued in February as the Lao still retained strategic high ground, with Thai airstrikes losing 2 aircraft. Talks eventually occurred on the 16-17th, and a ceasefire on the 19th saw both sides retreat 3km from the line of contact.

The brief war claimed a total of about 1,000 deaths, the Thais suffering more heavily since for much of the war they were attacking entrenched Lao positions. Gen Chavalit Yongchaiyudh was the commander of the Royal Thai Army at the time of the war and was criticized for engaging in it against the wishes of the Thai Ministry of Foreign Affairs. Vietnam had assisted its socialist ally, sending troops from its 2nd Division to Baan Nakok air field in Saiyabuli to support the Lao military operations, amidst the border clashes with Thailand along the Thai–Cambodian border.

Aftermath
The Thai-Lao Joint Boundary Commission (JBC) was established in 1996 to clarify the 1,810-kilometre boundary and settle ownership of the disputed villages.  border demarcation was on-going.

References 

1987 in Laos
1987 in Thailand
1988 in Laos
1988 in Thailand
Conflicts in 1987
Conflicts in 1988
Indochina Wars
Laos–Thailand border
Territorial disputes of Laos
Territorial disputes of Thailand
Third Indochina War
Wars involving Laos
Wars involving Thailand
Wars involving Vietnam
Proxy wars